Sakon Nakhon Rajabhat University Stadium is a multi-purpose stadium in Sakon Nakhon province, Thailand.  It is currently used mostly for football matches and is the home stadium of Sakon Nakhon F.C.

References

Multi-purpose stadiums in Thailand
Buildings and structures in Sakon Nakhon province
Sport in Sakon Nakhon province